Coccothrinax is a genus of fan palms found throughout the Caribbean and in adjacent parts of southern Florida and Mexico. This list of Coccothrinax species includes accepted names according to the World Checklist of Selected Plant Families. Most species are small to medium-sized, with maximum heights between 5 and 15 metres (17 and 49 ft). Fifty-four or 55 species are recognised; only one them C. readii, is absent from the insular Caribbean. Two species, C. argentata and C. barbadensis, are widespread, while most of the others are restricted to Cuba and Hispaniola.

Andrew Henderson, Gloria Galeano and Rodrigo Bernal only recognised 14 species of Coccothrinax in their Field Guide to the Palms of the Americas while Brett Jestrow and colleagues recognised 54. The World Checklist of Selected Plant Families recognises 55 species.

Coccothrinax acuminata Becc.
Coccothrinax acunana León
 Coccothrinax alexandri León
 C. alexandri subsp. alexandri
C. alexandri subsp. nitida (León) Borhidi & O.Muñiz,
 Coccothrinax alta (O.F.Cook) Becc.
 Coccothrinax argentata (Jacq.) L.H.Bailey Florida silver palm, Silver palm, Silver thatch palm, Biscayne palm, Palma de plata de Florida, Yuruguana de costa, Palmicha 
Coccothrinax argentata subsp. argentata
Coccothrinax argentata subsp. garberi (Chapm.) Zona
 Coccothrinax argentea (Lodd. ex Schult. & Schult.f.) Sarg. ex Becc. Broom palm, Hispaniolan silver palm, Silver thatch palm, Guano, Latanye maron, Latanye savanna, Palmera plateada de La Hispaniola, Guanito, Guano de escoba
 Coccothrinax baracoensis Borhidi & O.Muñiz
 Coccothrinax barbadensis Becc. Barbados silver palm, Silver palm, Thatch palm, Lesser Antilles silver thatch palm, Tyre palm, Palma de abanico
 Coccothrinax bermudezii León
 Coccothrinax borhidiana O.Muñiz Borhidi's guano palm 
 Coccothrinax boschiana Mejía &  R.G.García
 Coccothrinax camagueyana Borhidi & O.Muñiz
 Coccothrinax clarensis León
C. clarensis subsp. brevifolia (León) Borhidi & O.Muñiz
 C. clarensis subsp. clarensis
 Coccothrinax concolor Burret
 Coccothrinax crinita Becc. (Griseb. & H.Wendl. ex C.H.Wright) Becc. Old man palm, Thatch palm, Palma petate, Guano barbudo, Guano petate
C. crinita subsp. brevicrinis Borhidi & O.Muñiz
C. crinita subsp. crinita
 Coccothrinax cupularis (León) Borhidi & O.Muñiz
 Coccothrinax ekmanii Burret Gouane palm
 Coccothrinax elegans O.Muñiz & Borhidi
 Coccothrinax fagildei Borhidi & O.Muñiz Fagilde's Palm
 Coccothrinax fragrans Burret Fragrant Cuban thatch, Yuraguana
 Coccothrinax garciana León
 Coccothrinax gracilis Burret
 Coccothrinax guantanamensis  (León) O.Muñiz & Borhidi
 Coccothrinax gundlachii León Yuruguana
 Coccothrinax hioramii León
 Coccothrinax inaguensis Read 
 Coccothrinax jamaicensis Read Jamaica silver thatch
 Coccothrinax jimenezii M.M.Mejía & R.G.García
 Coccothrinax leonis O.Muñiz & Borhidi
 Coccothrinax litoralis León Cuban silver palm
 Coccothrinax macroglossa (León) Borhidi & O.Muñiz
 Coccothrinax microphylla Borhidi & O.Muñiz
 Coccothrinax miraguama (Kunth) Becc. Miraguano, Miraguama, Biraguano, Yuraguano, Guanito, Miraguama palm 
C. miraguama subsp. havanensis (León) Borhidi & O.Muñiz
C. miraguama subsp. miraguama
C. miraguama subsp. roseocarpa (León) Borhidi & O.Muñiz
 Coccothrinax moaensis (Borhidi & O.Muñiz) O.Muñiz
 Coccothrinax montana Burret
 Coccothrinax munizii Borhidi
 Coccothrinax muricata León
 Coccothrinax nipensis Borhidi] & O.Muñiz
 Coccothrinax orientalis León, O.Muñiz & Borhidi
 Coccothrinax pauciramosa Burret
 Coccothrinax proctorii Read  Cayman thatch palm, Protector's thatch palm
 Coccothrinax pseudorigida León
 Coccothrinax pumila Borhidi & J.A.Hern.
 Coccothrinax readii H.J.Quero Mexican silver palm 
 Coccothrinax rigida Becc.
 Coccothrinax salvatoris León
 C. salvatoris subsp. loricata (León) Borhidi & O.Muñiz
 C. salvatoris subsp. salvatoris
 Coccothrinax saxicola León
 Coccothrinax scoparia Becc.] Haitian mountain silver palm
 Coccothrinax spirituana Verdecia & Moya
 Coccothrinax spissa L.H.Bailey Guano, Swollen silver thatch palm 
 Coccothrinax torrida Morici & Verdecia
 Coccothrinax trinitensis Borhidi & O.Muñiz
 Coccothrinax victorini León
 Coccothrinax yunquensis Borhidi & O.Muñiz
 Coccothrinax yuraguana (A.Rich.) León Yuraguana

See also
 List of palms native to the Caribbean

References 

 
Coccothrinax